Filamin-binding LIM protein 1 is a protein that in humans is encoded by the FBLIM1 gene.

This gene encodes a protein with an N-terminal filamin-binding domain, a central proline-rich domain, and, multiple C-terminal LIM domains. This protein localizes at cell junctions and may link cell adhesion structures to the actin cytoskeleton. This protein may be involved in the assembly and stabilization of actin-filaments and likely plays a role in modulating cell adhesion, cell morphology and cell motility. This protein also localizes to the nucleus and may affect cardiomyocyte differentiation after binding with the CSX/NKX2-5 transcription factor. Alternative splicing results in multiple transcript variants encoding different isoforms.

Interactions
FBLIM1 has been shown to interact with Filamin, PLEKHC1 and FLNB.

References

Further reading